Corralito was the informal name for the economic measures taken in Argentina at the end of 2001 by Minister of Economy Domingo Cavallo in order to stop a bank run which implicated a limit of cash withdrawals of 250 ARS per week (at that time 1 USD = 1 ARS). Electronic transfers and credit and debit card payments were not disrupted.

The Spanish word corralito is the diminutive form of corral, which means "corral, animal pen, enclosure"; the diminutive is used in the sense of "small enclosure" and in Argentina also "a child's playpen". This expressive name alludes to the restrictions imposed by the measure. The term was coined by the journalist Antonio Laje.

Background and initial measures
In 2001, Argentina was in the midst of a crisis: heavily indebted, with an economy in complete stagnation (an almost three-year-long recession), and the exchange rate was fixed at one U. S. dollar per Argentine peso by law, which made exports uncompetitive and effectively deprived the state of having an independent monetary policy. Many Argentines, but most especially companies, fearing an economic crash and possibly a devaluation, were transforming pesos to dollars and withdrawing them from the banks in large amounts, usually transferring them to foreign accounts (capital flight).

On December 1, 2001, in order to stop this draining from destroying the banking system, the government froze all bank accounts, initially for 90 days. Only a small amount of cash was allowed for withdrawal on a weekly basis (initially 250 Argentine pesos, then 300), and only from accounts denominated in pesos. No withdrawals were allowed from accounts denominated in U.S. dollars, unless the owner agreed to convert the funds into pesos. Operations using credit cards, debit cards, cheques and other means of payment could be conducted normally, but the lack of cash availability caused numerous problems for the general public and for businesses.

Immediate effects

At the time, the average Argentine did not employ the banking system for daily uses; many did not have a personal bank account, and dealt only with cash. Debit cards were not popular and many businesses did not have the equipment to accept them. Thus the cash restrictions only exacerbated the recession and angered the public. President Fernando de la Rúa resigned on 20 December 2001 after violent riots, but the restrictions of the corralito were not lifted at the time.

The banks and their role in the crisis
It is generally agreed that the banks had a share of the blame for the situation that led to the corralito. In mid-2001, it was probably clear to bank owners and high-ranking officials that Argentina's banking system was going to crash, and some in fact may have spurred this outcome by letting their highest deposit holders know this news. These, mostly large companies, quickly moved their deposits abroad. Meanwhile, they continued to recommend their middle-class customers to enter deposits.

The end of the corralito and the beginning of corralón

After Eduardo Duhalde assumed the presidency, US denominated debt and deposits were forcibly exchanged for argentine pesos at 1.4 pesos per dollar for deposits and 1.0 for debt. The exchange rate spiked to 4 ARS/USD. The corralito was renamed corralón as people could not longer withdraw $250 dollars per week not because of a new limit but because they no longer had any dollars. Protests increased and banks were closed for months.

It is also believed that in the end the corralito ended up being good business for some international banks since they negotiated with the Argentine government to receive compensation bonds for the "missing" money, which in a large proportion had never really left their banks, only moved from one branch to another.

Most banks stayed in the country during the crisis, withstanding a severe damage to their reputation as well as (in certain cases) physical attacks. Others fled as soon as problems arose (for example, Scotiabank's Argentine branch, Scotiabank Quilmes).

See also

Plano Collor - a similar measure taken in Brazil
Cacerolazo
Corralón
Fractional-reserve banking
Third World debt

References

 El Correo
 "Argentina's crisis revisited"  BBC News

Economic history of Argentina
Presidency of Fernando de la Rúa
Spanish words and phrases